Most members of the Bunge, Tanzania's National Assembly, are elected concurrently by direct popular vote for 5-year terms.  Additional members are nominated by the President, and five seats are chosen by the Zanzibar House of Representatives.  Further seats are reserved for female members who are selected by their parties. General elections were held in 2005 and 2010 for the Bunge.

Parties
These parties have representatives in the National Assembly:
 CCM - Chama Cha Mapinduzi (the ruling party)
 CHADEMA - Chama Cha Demokrasia na Maendeleo
 CUF - Civic United Front
 TLP - Tanzania Labour Party
 UDP - United Democratic Party

2005-2010 Tanzanian Members of Parliament, sortable

Notes

Sources 
 
 

Members of the National Assembly (Tanzania)
National Assembly members
List